We Went to College is a 1936 American comedy film directed by Joseph Santley, written by Richard Maibaum and Maurice Rapf, and starring Charles Butterworth, Walter Abel, Hugh Herbert, Una Merkel and Edith Atwater. It was released on June 19, 1936, by Metro-Goldwyn-Mayer.

Plot

Cast 
 Charles Butterworth as Glenn Harvey
 Walter Abel as Phil Talbot
 Hugh Herbert as Professor Standish
 Una Merkel as Susan Standish
 Edith Atwater as Nina
 Walter Catlett as Senator Budger
 Charles Trowbridge as President Tomlin
 Tom Ricketts as 'Pop'

References

External links 
 
 

1936 films
1936 comedy films
American black-and-white films
American comedy films
1930s English-language films
Films directed by Joseph Santley
Films produced by Harry Rapf
Films set in universities and colleges
Metro-Goldwyn-Mayer films
Films with screenplays by Richard Maibaum
1930s American films
Films with screenplays by Maurice Rapf